In histology, osteoid is the unmineralized, organic portion of the bone matrix that forms prior to the maturation of  bone tissue. Osteoblasts begin the process of forming bone tissue by secreting the osteoid as several specific proteins. When the osteoid becomes mineralized, it and the adjacent bone cells have developed into new bone tissue.

Osteoid makes up about fifty percent of bone volume and forty percent of bone weight. It is composed of fibers and ground substance. The predominant type of fiber is type I collagen and comprises ninety percent of the osteoid. The ground substance is mostly made up of chondroitin sulfate and osteocalcin.

Disorders

When there is insufficient nutrient minerals or osteoblast dysfunction, the osteoid does not mineralize properly, and it accumulates. The resultant disorder is termed rickets in children and osteomalacia in adults. A deficiency of type I collagen, such as in osteogenesis imperfecta, also leads to defective osteoid and brittle, fracture-prone bones.

In some cases, secondary hyperparathyroidism can cause disturbance in mineralisation of calcium and phosphate.

Another condition is a disturbance in primitive transformed cells of mesenchymal origin which exhibit osteoblastic differentiation and produce malignant osteoid. This results in the formation of a malignant primary bone tumor known as osteosarcoma or osteogenic sarcoma. This malignancy most often develops in adolescence during periods of rapid osteoid formation (commonly referred to as growth spurts).

References

External links
  - "Bone, femur"
 Dr. Susan Ott's website on osteomalacia

Proteins
Bones